Pietro Negroni, also called Il Giovane Zingaro (the young gypsy) and Lo zingarello di Cosenza (the little gypsy from Cosenza) ( – 1565), was an Italian painter of the Renaissance period, active mainly in Naples. He was known for his altarpieces, mythological scenes and portraits.

Life
Negroni was a pupil of the painters Giovanni Antonio D’Amato and Marco Cardisco, and strongly influenced by Polidoro da Caravaggio. He painted an Adoration of Magi (1541) and Scourging of Christ for the church of Santa Maria Donna Regina Vecchia in Naples. He painted a Virgin with child and angels and saints for Sant'Agnello. He painted a Virgin and Child for Santa Croce in Lucca. He painted milk in Aversa and Cosenza, and an altarpiece in the church of the Congrega of Mongrassano in Calabria. He painted a portrait of a young man now at the Galleria Borghese in Rome.

References

External links

Further reading

Pietro Negroni as a Draughtsman, David Jaffe. The Burlington Magazine, Vol. 127, no. 984, March 1985, pages 157, 159.

1500s births
1565 deaths
People from Cosenza
16th-century Italian painters
Italian male painters
Italian Mannerist painters